Psychobiography aims to understand historically significant individuals, such as artists or political leaders, through the application of psychological theory and research.

Through its merging of personality psychology and historical evidence, psychobiography may be considered a historical form of therapeutic case study: it represents a growing field in the realm of biography. Psychopathography is sometimes used as a term to indicate that the person being analyzed was not mentally healthy, "path" coming from pathos (πάθος)—Ancient Greek for suffering or illness.

Background

Psychobiography is a field within the realms of psychology and biography that analyzes the lives of historically significant individuals through psychological theory and research. Its goal is to develop a better understanding of notable individuals by applying psychological theories to their biographies to further explain the motives behind some of the subjects actions and decisions. Popular subjects of psychobiographies include figures such as Adolf Hitler, Vincent van Gogh, William Shakespeare, Martin Luther King Jr., Abraham Lincoln, and Saddam Hussein. A typical biography is often very descriptive, and tries to record every notable event that happened in a person's lifetime, whereas a psychobiography primarily focuses on some particular events, and tries to better understand why they happened. This field's potential has not only aided in developing a better understanding to many notable biographies throughout history, but has also inspired direction and insight into the field of psychology.

One of the first great examples of this field's utility was Dr. Henry Murray's report on the analysis of Adolf Hitler's personality during the end of World War II. Forced to psychoanalyze from a distance, Dr. Murray used multiple sources, including Hitler's genealogy, Hitler's own writings, and biographies of Hitler, so that the Allied forces could understand his personality to better predict his behavior. By applying a theory of personality that consisted of 20 psychogenic needs, Dr. Murray presumed Hitler's personality as "counteractive narcism", and was able to correctly predict the German leader's suicide in the face of his country's defeat. This work by Dr. Murray not only helped establish personality psychology as a behavioral science, but it also showed how the field of psychobiography could be applied as a means of psychoanalysis.

Origins and development

Persons who have been the subject of psychobiographical research include Freud, Adolf Hitler, Sylvia Plath, Carl Jung, Vincent van Gogh, Martin Luther, Abraham Lincoln, Elvis Presley, Søren Kierkegaard, Friedrich Nietzsche, Andrew Jackson, and Richard Nixon.

Major psychobiographical authors include Erik Erikson, James William Anderson, Henry Murray, George Atwood, and William Runyan.

Many psychobiographies are Freudian or psychodynamic in orientation, but other commonly used theories include narrative models of identity such as the life story model, script theory, object relations, and existentialism/phenomenology; and psychobiographers are increasingly looking for explanatory complexity through an eclectic approach.

Though there were other psychobiographies written before Freud's Leonardo da Vinci and A Memory of His Childhood in 1910, it is considered the most significant contribution of its time, despite its flaws. Psychobiographies about William Shakespeare (Jones, 1910), Giovanni Segantini (Abraham, 1912), Richard Wagner (Graf, 1911), Amenhotep IV (Abraham, 1912), Martin Luther (Smith, 1913), and Socrates (Karpas, 1915) were also published between 1910 and 1915, but are not as well known. Between 1920 and 1926, psychobiographies of Margaret Fuller (Anthony, 1920), Samuel Adams (Harlow, 1923), Edgar Allan Poe (Krutch, 1926), and Abraham Lincoln (Clark, 1923) were published by authors from a psychoanalytic perspective without a background in psychoanalysis. During the 1930s Tolstoy, Dostoevsky, Molière, Sand, Goethe, Coleridge, Nietzsche, Poe, Rousseau, Caesar, Lincoln, Napoleon, Darwin, and Alexander the Great were the subjects of psychobiographies, and soon afterward in 1943 a psychobiography of Adolf Hitler, predicting his suicide, was written during World War II, but was not published until 1972. Recent, significant contributions between 1960 and 1990 include psychobiographies of Henry James (Edel, 1953–72), Isaac Newton (Manuel, 1968), Mohandas Gandhi (Erikson, 1969), Max Weber (Mitzman, 1969), Emily Dickinson (Cody, 1971), Joseph Stalin (Tucker, 1973), James and John Stuart Mill (Mazlish, 1975), T. E. Lawrence (Mack, 1976), Adolf Hitler (Waite, 1977), Beethoven (Solomon, 1977), Samuel Johnson (Bate, 1977), Alice James (Strouse, 1980), Wilhelm Reich (Sharaf, 1983), and William James (Feinstein, 1984). Some psychobiographies at this time were also written about groups of people, focusing on an aspect they had in common such as American presidents, philosophers, utopians, revolutionary leaders, and personality theorists. These psychobiographies are the most well known, but since 1910 there have been over 4000 psychobiographies published.

As psychobiography gained recognition, authors from a variety of professions contributed their own work from alternate perspectives and varying methods of analysis of the psychobiographical subjects, significantly expanding psychobiography beyond the psychoanalytical perspective. Apart from psychoanalysts and psychiatrists who wrote the first psychobiographies, there have been historians, political scientists, personality psychologists, literary critics, sociologists, and anthropologists that have contributed to the growth of the field.
Psychobiography has also conflicted with contemporary views of science since its origin because it contains no controlled variables or experimentation. In its early years it was dismissed as unscientific and not a legitimate addition to the field of psychology due to the push towards experimentation focused on physiological and biological factors, and away from philosophical psychology, to establish it as a natural science. The value of psychobiography to psychology is comparable to forensic science and archaeology, offering detailed analyses of subjects with an emphasis on contextual information, but due to the qualitative nature of this information it remains a challenge to validate psychobiographical works as empirically based applications of psychology.

Methodology

The discipline of psychobiography has developed various methodological guidelines for psychobiographical study. Some of the most prominent are these:

 The use of prototypical scenes in the life of the subject to serve as a model of their personality pattern
 The use of a series of indicators of salience, markers such as primacy, frequency, and uniqueness of an event in a life, to identify significant patterns
 The identification of pregnant metaphors or images that organize autobiographical narratives
 Logical coherence or consistency as a criterion for adequate psychological interpretations

Scholars untrained in the discipline who do not follow these guidelines continue to produce psychobiographical studies.

Contributors

Sigmund Freud

Freud's psychoanalytic approach (Freudian perspective) is not commonly used in its entirety in psychobiography, but it has had a lasting influence on the analysis of behavior in other areas of psychology. To sift through a lifetime of information and locate significant areas in the subject's development requires a system of identification, and psychoanalysis provided the base for this. Primacy, the initial exposure or experience, was recognized by Freud as an important factor in personality development and has remained an important aspect of personality psychology, psychotherapy, and psychobiography. Frequency, repeated exposure or actions, is also important, but its significance can vary. If the frequency of an action is low then it is seen as unimportant, and if the frequency is too high it becomes passive and overlooked, also becoming less important in psychobiography. Freud's knowledge of the importance of frequency is shown in the analysis of dreams, slips, errors, and humor by recognizing that repetition leads people to disregard these behaviors or stimuli. The importance of error in psychobiography, including slips and distortions, is also rooted in Freudian psychoanalysis and is used to identify hidden motives.

Elms

Elms has contributed to psychobiography through many published works including psychobiographies on Allport (1972), Freud (1980), Skinner (1981), and Murray (1987). He has also written about the subject of psychobiography in Psychobiography and Case Study Methods and Uncovering Lives: The Uneasy Alliance of Biography and Psychology defining psychobiography and its methods, and explaining the value of psychobiography in psychology.

Criticism
Psychobiography has faced criticism from the very start, crystallised above all in the production of what Erikson caricatured as "originology"—the explaining away of significant public events and actions as the product of some minute childhood detail.

Bad psychobiography—using mechanical psychologising, a selective mining of the facts, overdeterminism, and a tendency to pathologise—is considered easy to write. The haphazard historical evolution of the disciple has not helped reduce its prevalence.

References

Further reading
Ogilvie, Dan (2004). Fantasies of Flight. New York: Oxford University Press.
Runyan, William (1982). Life Histories and Psychobiography. New York: Oxford University Press.
Schultz, William Todd (2005). Handbook of Psychobiography. New York: Oxford University Press.

External links
 What is Psychobiography?
 Analysis of the Personality of Hitler

Applied psychology
Biography (genre)
Cultural history
Fields of history
Freudian psychology
Interdisciplinary historical research